Milan Vuković may refer to: 

 Milan Vuković (footballer)
 Milan Vuković (judge)